The Maine Lynx are a team of the Women's Spring Football League which began play in 2012.  Based in Portland, the Lynx play their home games at Memorial Stadium.

They played their inaugural year in the Women's Football Alliance before they switched to the WSFL for 2013.

Season-By-Season

|-
|2012 || 1 || 7 || 0 || 3rd National Division 1 || --

* = current standing

2012 roster

2012

Standings

Season schedule

External links 
 

Women's Football Alliance teams
Sports in Portland, Maine
American football teams in Maine
American football teams established in 2012
2012 establishments in Maine
Women's sports in Maine